The Port of Kilpilahti (also known by its Swedish name, Sköldvik) is a liquid cargo port in the city of Porvoo, on the Gulf of Finland shore some  east-by-northeast of Helsinki.

The port grew up around the Neste oil refinery built there in the mid-1960s, and even today it still mostly handles crude and refined oil and petrochemical products.

With total annual international cargo throughput of 22.4 million tons in 2018, Kilpilahti is the biggest port in Finland by cargo tonnage. Of the total, approximately ⅔ is made up of imports.

References

Kilpilahti
Water transport in Finland
Buildings and structures in Porvoo